This is a list of clubs that play Australian rules football in Western Australia at the senior level.

National Level

Australian Football League

State Level

West Australian Football League

Metropolitan / Country Level

Perth Football League

A Grade & A Reserves
Fremantle C.B.C Football Club
Kingsley Football Club
Kingsway Football Club
North Beach Football Club
North Fremantle Football Club
Scarborough Football Club
Trinity Aquinas Football Club
University Football Club
Wanneroo Football Club
Wembley Football Club
B Grade & B Reserves
Ballajura Football Club
Collegians Football Club
Curtin Uni Wesley Football Club
Kalamunda Football Club
Maddington Football Club
Mt Lawley Football Club
Swan Athletic Football Club
West Coast Amateur Football Club
Whitford Football Club
Willetton Football Club
C1 Grade & C1 Reserves
Bassendean Football Club
Bullcreek Leeming Football Club
Carlisle Football Club
Gosnells Football Club
Hammersley Carine Football Club
Kenwick Football Club
Melville Football Club
Ocean Ridge Football Club
Warnbro Swans Football Club
C2 Grade & C2 Reserves
Canning South Perth Football Club
Canning Vale Football Club
Coolbinia Football Club
Dianella Morley Football Club
High Wycombe Football Club
Kwinana Football Club
Quinns District Football Club
Stirling Football Club
Swan Valley Football Club
C3 Grade & C3 Reserves
Belmont Districts Football Club
Brentwood Booragoon Football Club
Cottesloe Football Club
Ellenbrook Football Club
Jandakot Football Club
Lynwood Ferndale Football Club
Mosman Park Football Club
Osborne Park Football Club
SNESA Football Club
C4 Grade & C4 Reserves
Armadale Football Club
Bayswater Football Club
Cobras Football Club
Cockburn Lakes Football Club
Forrestdale Football Club
Manning Football Club
Noranda Football Club
Piara Waters Football Club
Rossmoyne Football Club
Yanchep Football Clun
D Grade & D Reserves
Curtin Uni Wesley Football Club
Fremantle C.B.C Football Club
Kingsley Football Club
Mt Lawley Football Club
North Beach Football Club
North Fremantle Football Club
Ocean Ridge Football Club
Trinity Aquinas Football Club
University Football Club
Wanneroo Football Club
Wembley Football Club
Whitford Football Club

E1 Grade
Bullcreek Leeming Football League
Coolbellup Football Club
East Fremantle Football Club
Fremantle C.B.C Football Club
Kingsway Football Club
North Beach Football Club
Roleystone Football Club
Scarborough Football Club
Swan Athletic Football Club
West Coast Amateur Football Club
E2 Grade
Ballajura Football Club
Bassendean Football Club
Coolbinia Football Club
Curtin Uni Wesley Football Clun
ECU Jets
Forrestfield Football Club
Gosnells Football Club
Hammersley Carine Football Club
Quinns District Football Club
Willetton Football Club
E3 Grade
Carlisle Football Club
Cobras Football Club
Ellenbrook Football Club
Jandakot Football Club
Kalamunda Football Club
Melville Football Club
North Beach Football Club
Osborne Park Football Club
Piara Waters Football Club
SNESA Football Club
Swan Valley Football Club
Warnbro Swans Football Club

Metro Football League Division 1
Baldivis Football Club
Dwellingup Football Club
Gosnells Football Club
Kelmscott Bulldogs
Koongamia Football Club
Midland Football Club
Queens Park Football Club
Safety Bay Football Club
Wanneroo Football Club
Warwick Greenwood Football Club

Metro Football League Division 2
Baldivis Football Club
Balga Senior Football Club
Beechboro Senior Football Club
Brighton Seahawks Football Club
ECU Jets
Innaloo Football Club
Kelmscott Bulldogs Football Club

Queens Park Football Club
Rostrata Football Club
Warwick Greenwood Football Club

Avon Football Association

Kellerberrin/Tammin Football Club
Railways Football Club (Northam)
Quairading Football Club
York Football Club
Beverley Football Club
Federals Football Club
Cunderdin Football Club

Central Kimberley Football League

Bombers Football Club
Bulldogs Football Club
Blues Football Club
Tigers Football Club
Crows Football Club
Magpies Football Club
Crocs Football Club

Central Midlands Coastal Football League

Jurien Bay Football Club
Moora Rovers Football Club
Dandaragan Football Club
Lancelin Football Club
Cervantes Football Club
Moora Warriors Football Club

Central Wheatbelt Football League

Beacon Football Club
Kalannie Football Club
Koorda Football Club
Mukinbudin Football Club
Nungarin Football Club
Bencubbin Football Club

Eastern Districts Football League

Narembeen Football Club
Kulin/Kondinin Football Club
Hyden/Karlgarin Football Club
Nukarni Football Club
Corrigin Football Club
Bruce Rock Football Club
Burracoppin Football Club
Southern Cross Football Club

East Kimberley Football Association

Waringarri Football Club
Ord River Football Club
Halls Creek Football Club
Warmun Football Club
Kununurra Football Club
Wyndham Football Club
Kundat Djaru Football Club

Esperance District Football Association

Newtown Condingup Football Club
Ports Football Club
Gibson Football Club
Esperance Football Club

Fortescue National Football League

Panthers Football Club
Saints Football Club
Towns Football Club
Tigers Football Club

Gascoyne Football Association

Ramblers Football Club
Exmouth Football Club
Warriors Football Club
Gascoyne Football Club

Goldfields Football League

Railways Football Club
Mines Rovers Football Club
Kalgoorlie City Football Club
Boulder City Football Club
Kambalda Football Club

Great Northern Football League

Brigades Football Club
Towns Football Club
Railway Football Club
Chapman Valley Football Club
Mullewa Football Club
Rovers Football Club
Northampton Football Club

Great Southern Football League

Royals Football Club
North Albany Football Club
Railways Football Club
Mount Barker Football Club
Denmark Walpole Football Club

Hills Football Association

Gidgegannup Football Club
Mundaring Football Club
Chidlow Football Club
Bullsbrook Football Club
Mt Helena Football Club

Lower South West Football League

Kojonup Football Club
Imperials Football Club
Deanmill Football Club
Boyup Brook Football Club
Tigers Football Club
Southerners Football Club
Bridgetown Football Club

Mortlock Football League

Dowerin Football Club
Wongan Ballidu Football Club
Gingin Football Club
Toodyay Football Club
Calingiri Football Club
Goomalling Football Club
Dalwallinu Football Club
Wyalkatchem Football Club

Newman National Football League

Centrals Football Club
Tigers Football Club
Pioneers Football Club
Saints Football Club

North Midlands Football League

Mingenew Football Club
Three Springs Football Club
Coorow-Latham Football Club
Carnamah-Perenjori Football Club
Morawa Football Club
Dongara Football Club

North Pilbara Football League

Falcons Football Club
Sharks Football Club
Kats Football Club
Rovers Football Club
Swans Football Club
Wolves Football Club

Ongerup Football Association

Jerramungup Football Club
Newdegate Football Club
Boxwood Hills Football Club
Kent Football Club
Gnowangerup Football Club
Ongerup Football Club
Borden Football Club
Lake Grace/Pingrup Football Club

Ravensthorpe & District Football Association

Ravensthorpe Tigers Football Club
Southerners Football Club
Lakes Football Club

South West Football League

Carey Park Football Club
South Bunbury Football Club
Collie Eagles Football Club
Bunbury Football Club
Harvey Brunswick Lesch Football Club
Busselton Football Club
Donnybrook Football Club
Eaton Boomers Football Club
Augusta Margaret River Football Club
Harvey Bulls Football Club

Upper Great Southern Football League

Williams Football Club
Wickepin Football Club
Narrogin Hawks Football Club
Katanning Wanderers Football Club
Boddington Football Club
Wagin Football Club
Kukerin/Dumbleyung Football Club
Brookton/Pingelly Football Club

West Kimberley Football Association

Towns Football Club
Broome Bulls Football Club
Broome Saints Football Club
Peninsula Bombers Football Club
Bidyadanga Football Club
Cable Beach Football Club
Derby Tigers Football Club
Looma Eagles Football Club

Peel Football League

Mandurah Football Club
Waroona Football Club
Pinjarra Football Club
South Mandurah Football Club
Baldivis Football Club
Rockingham Football Club
Centrals Football Club (Western Australia)
Halls Head Football Club

Western Australia
 
Western Australia sport-related lists